Hasse Rosbach is a Norwegian music producer, engineer, arranger and musician.

Career 
Rosbach has participated on a number of productions as a Producer, Engineer, Mixer, Arranger and/or Musician including records by Moddi, Turbonegro, Highasakite, Team Me, Bendik HK, Rasmus Rohde, Motorpsycho, Shining, Enslaved, Bushman's Revenge, Marit Larsen, Odd Nordstoga, Das Body, Mathias Eick, Gammalgrass (Stian Carstensen, Ola Kvernberg, Ole Morten Vågan), Hilde Marie Kjersem, Heroes & Zeros, Superfamily, Huntsville, Hanne Hukkelberg, Lars Vaular, Thomas Eriksen, Bare Egil Band, Grand Island, Shimmering, Sauropod, Maria Mena, Elvira Nikolaisen, Pristine, Deliriums, Level & Tyson, Einar Stray Orchestra, Skambankt, Kaizers Orchestra, Katzenjammer, Thom Hell, Lydmor, Staut, Inga Juuso, Animal Alpha, film scores by Peder Kjellsby for "Varg Veum" and "Som Jeg Ser Deg" ("I Belong") and more 

As an arranger Rosbach has written arrangements for the Trondheim Soloists and the Norwegian Radio Orchestra (Kringkastingsorkesteret) in addition to a number of album productions. He was also the Musical Director and Arranger for Moddi’s extensive “Unsongs”-tour with the Trondheim Soloists.

He was a member of the Norwegian band Superfamily and won a Spellemann (Norwegian Grammy Award) in the pop category for their album “Warszawa” in 2007.
In 2011, Team Me's "To The Treetops" was awarded a Norwegian Grammy in the category "Pop Band of the Year", and in 2013 the Moddi album "kæm va du?" was awarded a Norwegian Grammy for "Folk album of the Year"

Rosbach worked several years at Propeller Music Division in Oslo before starting up the recording facilities Albatross Recorders together with Even Ormestad and Martin Sjølie.

References

Living people
1985 births
Musicians from Sarpsborg
21st-century Norwegian musicians
Norwegian record producers